Speedline may refer to:
Speed line, artistic lines indicating speed and direction of travel
PATCO Speedline, a rapid transit system
Speedline Corse and Speedline Truck, brands of magnesium wheels produced by Ronal
SPEEDLINE, the call sign for the former Airspeed Aviation; see Abbotsford International Airport
SpeedLine, a rifle manufactured by Verney-Carron